The Siqurto foot tunnel crosses beneath the Imba Tsiyon ridge, which forms the water divide between the Giba and Weri'i basins. The ridge is part of the Mugulat Mountains, Tigray, Ethiopia,

Design and construction
The tunnel was hewn in the Adigrat Sandstone rock in the same period when rock churches were built in Tigray.
During the period of Italian occupation of Ethiopia, local people closed and hid the tunnel, forcing Italian troops and administrators to travel longer distances.

Location
The tunnel links

 Nebelet and May Zerqu’it at the west 

with

 Ga’ibien and Adigrat at the east.
The use of the tunnel allows decreasing the travel distance on foot between Nebelet and Adigrat by 8 kilometres.

Usage
The tunnel is used daily by local farmers, with their donkeys, mules and oxen.

Upgrade works
The bottom was strengthened with steps and pavement.

Notes

 Buildings and structures in Ethiopia
 Transport in Ethiopia
 Pedestrian tunnels
Tourist attractions in Ethiopia